Luke Keith Wade-Slater (born 2 March 1998) is an Irish footballer who plays for NIFL Premiership club Warrenpoint Town.

Club career

Stevenage
Wade-Slater joined Stevenage as an academy scholar in the summer of 2015, having previously played at Irish academy team St Kevin's Boys. He played regularly for Stevenage's under-18 team for two seasons, also playing in the club's FA Youth Cup run during the 2015–16 season. He made his first-team debut for Stevenage on 8 November 2016, coming on as a 77th-minute substitute in a 4–0 EFL Trophy victory over Southend United at Broadhall Way. He subsequently signed his first professional contract with the club on 23 May 2017. Wade-Slater made his Football League debut as a second-half substitute in Stevenage's 1–0 away defeat to Crewe Alexandra on 7 October 2017. He signed a "new and improved" contract with the Hertfordshire club on 6 December 2017.

Having made no first-team appearances three months into the 2018–19 season, Wade-Slater joined Kings Langley of the Southern League Premier Division South on loan on 6 November 2018, with the agreement running until January 2019. He made his debut for Kings Langley on 10 November 2018, scoring the only goal of the game in a 1–0 away victory at Farnborough. He went on to score in each of his first five appearances for Kings Langley, making six appearances during the loan spell, before being recalled by Stevenage in December 2018.

Bohemians
Following his recall from Kings Langley in December 2018, Wade-Slater signed for League of Ireland Premier Division club Bohemians, officially joining on 1 January 2019.

Larne
Wade-Slater signed for NIFL Premiership club Larne on 5 October 2020.

Warrenpoint Town 
It was announced on 23 June 2021, that Wade-Slater had signed a contract with NIFL Premiership side Warrenpoint Town.

International career
Wade-Slater appeared regularly for Republic of Ireland at under-17 level, making his debut in February 2015 and earning five caps throughout 2015. He was then called up to play for the under-18 team in May 2016, playing three times within the space of a month.

Career statistics

Honours
Larne
County Antrim Shield 2020–21

References

External links

1998 births
Living people
Republic of Ireland association footballers
Association football defenders
Stevenage F.C. players
Kings Langley F.C. players
Bohemian F.C. players
Larne F.C. players
Warrenpoint Town F.C. players
English Football League players
Republic of Ireland youth international footballers
League of Ireland players
NIFL Premiership players